Chun Beeho (Republic of Korea, 1957) is a distinguished professor of Sungkyunkwan University in Seoul in the Republic of Korea since march 2018, after serving as ambassador to Mexico from June 19, 2015, though December 31, 2017. Currently, he is the vice president of the Korean Council on Foreign Relations, of which members are incumbent and retired diplomats and ambassadors.

Education
Dr. Chun Beeho holds a bachelor's degree in political science at the Sungkyunkwan University in Seoul, a master's degree in European Community studies from the Polytechnic University of Madrid (Universidad Politecnica de Madrid) in Spain, and a PhD. in Political Sciences and Sociology of the Complutense University of Madrid (Universidad Complutense de Madrid), Spain. His master's thesis included an  Analysis on Trade between the European Community and Newly industrialized Developing Countries in Asia (Polytechnic University of Madrid, Spain, 1990), and his Doctoral Thesis was related to an Analysis on the integration of the European Union and its Political and Economic implications with Asia (Complutense University of Madrid, Spain 2001).
He holds a degree of doctor honorary causa in philology science from Sofia University of Bulgaria and a degree of doctor honorary causa from Bulgaria Science Academy.
Currently, he is a distinguished professor of College of Engineering of Sungkyunkwan University in Seoul, together with holding the post of Director of International Cooperation Development Center of the University.

Professional career
Chun's diplomatic career began in 1980 joining the Ministry of Foreign Affairs of the Republic of Korea after having passed the Diplomatic Service Examination in the same year. Following the Ambassador Extraordinary and Plenipotentiary  to Bulgaria and Mexico, since 2018 he served as Distinguished Professor of Sungkyunkwan University in Seoul.

The brief CV of Dr. Chun Beeho is as follows:
       
in August 1980 Joined the Ministry of Foreign Affairs (MOFA), 
in February 1985 Third Secretary, Korean Embassy in the Republic of Costa Rica, 
in November 1992 First Secretary, Korean Embassy in the United Mexican States,
in June 1995 First Secretary, Korean Mission to the European Community in Belgium,
in March 1998 Director for Administrative Management and Legal Affairs, Ministry of Foreign Affairs and Trade (MOFAT),
in May 1999 Director, European Trade Division, Bilateral Trade Bureau, MOFAT,
in December 2000 Counsellor, Korean Embassy in the United Mexican States,
in December 2002 Counsellor, Korean Embassy in the French Republic,
in December 2005 Senior Director for Trade Policy Planning and Public Relations, MOFAT, 
in April 2007 Director General for Diplomatic Competency Assessment, Institute of Foreign Affairs and National Security (IFANS), Ministry of Foreign Affairs and Trade (MOFAT),
in April 2008 Dean of Education and Training, Central Officials Training Institute, Ministry of Public Administration and Security (MOPAS),
in January 2010 Ambassador Extraordinary and Plenipotentiary to the Republic of Bulgaria,
in November 2013 Ambassador for International Relations, Gangwon Province, Korea,		
in April 2015 Ambassador Extraordinary and Plenipotentiary to the United Mexican States (until December 2017), and
in March 2018 Distinguished Professor, giving lectures at the College of Engineering and the Graduate School of National Strategy & Director of Center of International Development Cooperation, Sungkyunkwan University in Seoul.

Since 2015, he represented the Diplomatic Mission of the Republic of Korea in the United States of Mexico. Presenting on June 19, 2015 Credentials to the President of the United Mexican States, Enrique Peña Nieto.

His diplomatic legacy in Mexico included the promotion of an FTA between the Republic of Korea and Mexico; the promotion of Foreign Direct Investment of Korean Companies in Mexico and Promotion of National Content in Mexican Exports; the Creation of Academic Industrial Cooperation Centers (ICC) for the technology transfer between State of Mexico, Mexico and the Republic of Korea; Academic, scientific, technological and cultural cooperation between the Republic of Korea and Universities in Mexico; Promotion of the First Direct Flight between South Korea and Mexico, operated by Aeromexico; The naming of Avenue Republic of Korea by the Major of Mérida, Yucatán.

As a South Korean diplomat, he served as visiting speaker in Bulgaria, Costa Rica, Cuba, France, Indonesia, Mexico, South Korea, Spain and Thailand. He has participated as Academic Lecturer in prestigious universities as Mines Paris ("South Korea: France's Strategic Partner in Asia", 2004), the Monterrey Institute of Technology and Higher Education Campus Monterrey ("Free Trade Strategy between South Korea and Mexico", 2017), Colmex in Mexico City ("The Foreign Trade Policy of Korea and the Impetus for Free Trade between Korea and Mexico", 2017), the Sungkyunkwan University in Seoul ("Analysis on the Korea's FTA strategy towards Asia", 2007; "Economic Integration in the East Asia Region", 2008), and the University of Sofia in Bulgaria ("Government Policy Review of the Republic of Korea", 2010; "South Korea as Crossroads of Asia", 2012).

Since 2018 he started a professional academic career as Distinguished Professor, Graduate School of National Strategy of Sungkyunkwan University in Seoul, South Korea by giving lectures on Foreign Policy, Globalization and Global Strategy, etc. He was also named as Director of Center of International Development Cooperation of the University in September 2018.

Academic articles, dissertations and books
Analysis on the trade between the European Community and Newly industrialized developing countries in Asia (Master's Thesis, Polytechnic University of Madrid, España 1990). 
The Single Market of the European Community and Developing Countries (Dissertation, 1991).  
Analysis on the integration of the European Union and its political and economic relations with Asia (PHD Degree Thesis, Complutense University of Madrid, España 2001). 
Innovation & The Academy: The Case of South Korea.
A Bulgarian View of the Republic of Korea.
Information Book on the shipbuilding negotiations between the European Union and the Republic of Korea (2000).	
Analysis on the external relations of the European Community (Contemporary international politics by Dr. Yoon Keon-shik, 1991).
The Small and Medium enterprise policy of the European Community (1992, KITA).
The integration of the European Community and the trade policy recommendation to the Korean Government (1992, KITA).
The facts of the Korea-US Free Trade Agreement: meaning and expected effect (March 2006).
The status and strategy of Korea's FTA policy toward Asia (East Asia Brief by the Sungkwonkwan University, 2007).
The way to train global sports leaders for strengthening Sports Diplomacy (2008).	
 "Evolution of Bilateral Relations between the Republic of Korea and the Republic of Bulgaria" (Conference paper collection of "Korea as Crossroads of Asia", national conference on Korean studies, University of Sofia, 2012).
 Let's prepare for Yeosu EXPO assessment (Maritime Economic Newspaper, March 17, 2007).
 Reasons to turn eyes to the East of Balkan region (Hankyung newspaper, February 2010).
 Bulgaria waiting for Korea (Munhwa Daily, December 2010).
 Bulgaria as new ground for Green industry (Hankooki daily, February 2011).
 Han wave on the Balkans (Munhwa Daily, September 2011).
 Korea-Bulgaria Policy Forum 2012 (Editor, Embassy of the Republic of Korea, Sofia University, May 30, 2012)
 Mexico, FTA Hub where Foreign Direct Investments are rushing (Hankyung, January 16, 2016).

Other diplomatic activities, trade & investment promotion
Agreement on Korea-EU shipbuilding industry, 2003.	
Establishing diplomatic competency assessment system for the officials of the Ministry of Foreign Affairs and Trade, 2006-2007.		
Establishing competency-based training system for the officials of the Central Government, 2009.	
Implementing Korea-Bulgaria Strategic partnership agenda for the 20th anniversary of establishing diplomatic relations, 2010.	
 Launch of 2010 first Korea-Bulgaria Policy Forum, Sofia University.
Establishing of the Korea-Bulgaria IT Cooperation, Center at Sofia University St. Kliment Ohridski, 2010.                                                               
Subscription of the Agreement on the mutual recognition of driving licenses between Korea and Bulgaria, 2011.	
Launch of "Incubation Academic Project", carried out by the St Kliment Ohridski University of Sofia and Sungkyunkwan University of Korea, 2011.                                                          
Initiative and hosting of the 2012 Korea-Bulgaria Policy Forum at the University of Sofia, 2012.                                                                                                             
Initiative and carrying out of the first ever Korea – Bulgaria Science & Technology Forum bringing together Bulgarian Academy of Science and Korean Institute for Science & Technology for joint research projects, 2012.
Opening of Permanent Korean Salon in National Cultural Museum of Mexico, October 2015 
Subscription of MOU on Korea-Mexico cooperation in electronic government, October 2015 
Negotiation & Settlement with the Governor of Nuevo Leon State of Mexico on investment incentive issues for successful Kia Motors investment in Monterrey, September 2016 
Opening of Korea 2016 International Fair, UDEM, University of Monterrey, Mexico 
Inauguration of direct flight of AEROMEXICO between Mexico and Incheon, South Korea July 2017
Donation of US$1 million for Mexico's restoration from earthquake, September 2017
Opening 2nd International Workshop of Korean Studies, September 2017, College of Mexico 
Donation to INAH (National Institute of Anthropology History of Mexico) of copy version of 'JikJi', the oldest book printed by metal letter in the world, December 2017 
Nomination of 'Avenida República de Corea' in Merida, Yucatan State, Mexico together with Mayor of Merida City, Don. Mauricio Vila Dosal, December 21, 2017

Academic & professional lectures, conferences and panels
 Relations between Korea and Mexico in the 21st Century (June 22, 2001, Autonomous University of Ecatepec, Mexico).
 Commercial and investment exchange between Mexico and South Korea (December 10, 2002, Universidad Autónoma Chapingo, México).
 Korea: France's strategic partner in Asia (March 2004, Ecole des Mines, Paris).
 Diplomatic Competency Assessment & Performance Management (June 12, 2007, Institute of Foreign Service, Ministry of Foreign Affairs of Thailand).
 Shortcut to Strengthen Diplomatic Competitiveness: Diplomatic Competency Assessment (July 30, 2007, Conference on Innovative Brands, Korea).
 Analysis on Korea's FTA strategy towards Asia (November 27, 2007, Sungkyunkwan University, Korea).
 Corporate-Government Cooperation in Korea (July 21, 2008, ENA, Indonesia).
 Economic Integration in the East Asia Region (November 11, 2008, East Asia in the 21st Century program of East Asia Academy, Sung Kyun Kwan University, Korea).
 Korea's FTA policy towards Asia (November 2008, the program for ASEAN government officials, COTI (Central Officials Training Institute, Korea).
 Government Policy Review of the Republic of Korea; economic development (October 11, 2010, Department of Public administration of St. Kliment Ohridski University of Sofia, Bulgaria).
 Nuclear Power of Korea (June 2011, International Conference on Bulgarian Nuclear Energy by BULATOM, Varna, Bulgaria).
 Korea as Crossroads of Asia (National Scientific Conference of the Korean Studies Department of the University of Sofia, 2012).
 Korean Nuclear Energy Roadmap (speaker at BULATOM Annual International Nuclear Conference, Varna, 2012).
 Korea and Bulgaria on the Road to Comprehensive Partnership (lecture in Veliko Tarnovo University, 2012).
 Korea-Mexico Bilateral Relations (November 2016, University of Monterrey, Mexico).
 The Bilateral Cooperation between Mexico and the Republic of Korea (November 2016, The Commission of External relations and Asia-Pacific, Senate of Mexico).
 Panorama of the Bilateral relations between South Korea and Mexico (November 2017, University of Mar, Mexico). 
 The Foreign Trade Policy of Korea and the Impetus for Free Trade between Korea and Mexico (Lecture during the Second International Workshop on Korean Studies of El Colegio de México, 2017).
 Free Trade Strategy between South Korea and Mexico, Monterrey Tec, Campus Monterrey (2017).
"Meeting the imperative of economic partners diversification"  Panelist Speech of 2017 Mexico Business Summit, San Luis Potosí  
 The Result of Presidential Election of Mexico and the Business Strategy by Korean Enterprises (July 2018, The 100th Latin Forum by Korean Council on Latin America and the Caribbean).
 Korea's Associate Membership of Pacific Alliance, International Forum on Korea's Future Associate Membership to the Pacific Alliance, (October 5, 2018, Sungkyunkwan University).
 Regional Affairs and cultures of Latin America and the Caribbean (December 2018, National HRD Institute, South Korea).
 Contemporary world and Global Perspective (2018, 2019, Seoul National University, South Korea).

Awards
 Service Merit Medal, Republic of Korea (December 2007)
 Order of Stara Planina 1st Class, Bulgaria (May 2013)
 Red Stripes Order of Service Merit, Republic of Korea (June 2018)
 Order of Aguila Azteca, Mexico (September 2018)
 Doctor honoris causa from the University of Sofia

See also
 List of diplomatic missions of South Korea
 Politics of South Korea
 Korean immigration to Mexico
 Culture of South Korea

References

1957 births
Ambassadors of South Korea to Mexico
Sungkyunkwan University alumni
Living people